General Sir William Fawcett KB (1727–1804) was an Adjutant-General to the Forces.

Military career
 
Educated at Bury Grammar School in Lancashire, William Fawcett was commissioned into the 33rd Foot in 1748.

In 1758 he was despatched to the War in Germany where he became an Aide-de-Camp to the Marquess of Granby. Then in 1775 he was sent to Hannover, Hesse-Cassel, Hesse-Hanau and Hanover to recruit troops for the War in America. The majority of the German troops who fought on the British side in the conflict were known as the "Hessians" in reference to the place of origin.

He was appointed Adjutant-General to the Forces in 1781: in this role he was involved in introducing Regulations for the Heavy Infantry and then for the Cavalry.

In retirement he served as Governor of the Royal Hospital Chelsea from 1796 until 1804.

He lived at 31 Great George Street in London.

Family
In 1749 he married Susannah Brook and together they had eight children. Following her death on 7 April 1783 he married Charlotte Stinton (d. 1805): they had no children.

See also
 List of military leaders in the American Revolutionary War

References

 

 

1727 births
1804 deaths
3rd Dragoon Guards officers
Knights Companion of the Order of the Bath
British Army generals
33rd Regiment of Foot officers
East Yorkshire Regiment officers
British Army personnel of the American Revolutionary War
People from Halifax, West Yorkshire
People educated at Bury Grammar School
Members of the Privy Council of Great Britain